High Freakquency is a 1998 comedy directed by Tony Singletary about life at an urban radio station. The film's tagline is Where Comedy Is In Heavy Rotation.

Synopsis
24-7 Radio finds itself at the top of the charts, yet all is not well in radio paradise as a series of quirky and mentally challenged DJ's jockey for ratings and professional success.

Station Manager Wes Thomas (John Witherspoon), is trying to force an inappropriate play list on station DJ and Program Director Jordan (Marcus Chong). Jordan resists the songs for music that moves the listeners. He teams up with the support of fellow DJ Venom (Adrienne-Joi Johnson), as a romance develops between the two. Also starring Ajai Sanders) and a special appearance by Adina Howard.

Cast
John Witherspoon as Wes Thomas
Marcus Chong as Jordan Barnes
Adrienne-Joi Johnson as D.J. Venom
Deon Richmond as Coffee Boy
Ajai Sanders as LaShanda
Paul Mooney as Love Doctor
Adina Howard as Performer

Home video
For one of the film's DVD releases it is titled "Da Station" with the closing credits edited out, and the DVD cover crediting Alan Smithee as the director.

External links

1998 comedy films
1998 films
African-American comedy films
Films about radio people
1998 directorial debut films
1990s English-language films
1990s American films